The 1982 South African Grand Prix was a Formula One motor race held at Kyalami on 23 January 1982. It was the first race of the 1982 Formula One World Championship. It was the 28th edition of the South African Grand Prix and the 16th time that the race had been held at Kyalami.

The prelude to the race was notable for a strike action by the Grand Prix Drivers' Association, led by Niki Lauda and Didier Pironi, in protest at the new superlicence conditions imposed by FISA, which would have tied the drivers to a single team for up to three years. A late compromise was reached and the race went ahead. The drivers were subsequently fined between US$5,000 and US$10,000 and handed suspended race bans; however, the FIA Court of Appeal later reduced the penalties and criticised FISA's handling of the dispute.

Turbocharged cars took the first six positions on the grid. Despite Alain Prost suffering a puncture while leading, he was able to recover to win the race. Lauda, in his first race after two years out of F1, finished fourth. It was the final podium finish for Carlos Reutemann, who retired from Formula One after the next race in Brazil. It also was the last race held in January.

Classification

Qualifying

Race

Championship standings after the race 

Drivers' Championship standings

Constructors' Championship standings

References

South African Grand Prix
South African Grand Prix
Grand Prix
South African Grand Prix
Formula One controversies